Black United Front also known as The Black United Front of Nova Scotia or simply BUF was a Black nationalist organization primarily  based in Halifax, Nova Scotia during the Civil Rights Movement in the United States.  Preceded by the Nova Scotia Association for the Advancement of Coloured People (NSAACP), the BUF organization was founded by William Pearly Oliver and Burnley "Rocky" Jones among others.  It was founded in 1965 and loosely based on the 10 point program of the Black Panther Party. In 1968, Stokely Carmichael, popular for coining the phrase Black Power!, visited Nova Scotia helping organize the BUF. The organization remained in operation until 1996.

The Black United Front did a lot to benefit the Black Nova Scotian community. The organization held 
discussions about employment, housing and educational opportunities. The group also formed its own community police force to keep hard drugs out of Halifax communities, prevent police brutality in communities of colour, and built a park for young children called the Tot-Lot. Additionally, they provided legal aid in the forms of free legal advice and discounted, even sometimes free legal service to the Black community. The Black United Front reportedly "Shook up whites in Canada".

Notable members 

Burnley "Rocky" Jones
Yvonne Atwell was once a member of the BUF, and for many years served as president of the Black United Front.
Buddy Daye

Hosts and producers of Upfront Television Program 1986-89  (BUF funded project)

The Ten Point Program
The Ten Point Program was as follows: 
We want freedom. We want to be able to control the destiny of Black and oppressed communities. 

We want full employment for our people. 

We want an end to the robbery by the capitalists, of our black and oppressed communities. 

We want decent housing, fit for the shelter of human beings. 

We want decent education for all people and an education that teaches us our true history and role in present society. 

We want our community to be healthy and for them use to their advantage, the free health care in this nation. 

We want an immediate end to police brutality and murder of Black people, other people of color, and all oppressed people in this nation. 

We want an immediate end to all wars. 

We want adequate rights for all Black and oppressed people held in federal, provincial, county, municipal prisons and jails.  

We want land, bread, housing, education, clothing, justice and peace.

Newspaper
The Black United Front published a newspaper called The Rap from 1986 until 1988. The Nova Scotia Archives has digitised all issues of this paper and published them online.

See also
Black Panther Party
Poor Boy's Game
Speak It! From the Heart of Black Nova Scotia
Malcolm X
Black Cultural Centre for Nova Scotia
Black Nova Scotians

References

African and Black nationalism in North America
History of Black people in Canada
Youth empowerment organizations
Politics of Nova Scotia
Movements for civil rights
Black Nova Scotians
History of Nova Scotia
Civil rights organizations in Canada
Black Canadian organizations